Yunling may refer to the following locations in China:

Yunling Mountains (云岭山), the namesake of Yunnan
Yunling, the mausoleum of Lady Gouyi
Yunling, Anhui (云陵镇), town in Jing County, Anhui, China
Yunling, Fujian (云陵镇), town in Fujian, China